Abdul Aziz Khandaker (1923–1991) is a Awami League politician and the former Member of Parliament of Patuakhali-6.

Career
Khandaker was elected to parliament from Patuakhali-6 as an Awami League candidate in 1973.

References

Awami League politicians
1923 births
1991 deaths
1st Jatiya Sangsad members